John P. Ferguson was an American politician in the Delaware House of Representatives. He was elected with no opposing candidates in 1978 as a member of the Democratic Party in the 20th representative district, New Castle County.

References 

20th-century American politicians
Democratic Party members of the Delaware House of Representatives